This page provides the summaries of the OFC second round matches for 1994 FIFA World Cup qualification.

Format
In this round the two winning teams from the first round were drawn into two home-and-away ties.

The winners advanced to the CONCACAF–OFC play-off.

Matches

 

Australia won 4–0 on aggregate and advanced to the CONCACAF–OFC play-off.

External links

2
1993
1993
1993 in Australian soccer
1993 in New Zealand association football